Nowy Nacpolsk  is a village in the administrative district of Gmina Naruszewo, within Płońsk County, Masovian Voivodeship, in east-central Poland.

The village has a population of 83.

References

Nowy Nacpolsk